Francis Sutton (28 June 1879 – 12 June 1956) was a Cape Colony cricketer. He played in one first-class match for Border in 1902/03.

See also
 List of Border representative cricketers

References

External links
 

1879 births
1956 deaths
Cricketers from Cape Colony
Border cricketers
People from Swellendam
Cricketers from the Western Cape